Sir Louis Addin Kershaw (27 December 1844 – 17 February 1899) was a British-American judge who was Chief Justice of the Bombay High Court and Allahabad High Court.

Career
Kershaw was born in Ohio, United States to British parents Matthew and Sarah Kershaw. He studied in Bradford Grammar School at Bradford and Pembroke College, Oxford. 

On 18 November 1872, he was called to the bar at the Inner Temple and worked as revising Barrister at Yorkshire. 

In 1898, he was knighted and appointed the Chief Justice of Allahabad after John Edge. He became the Chief Justice of the Bombay High Court, succeeding Sir Charles Frederick Farran. Kershaw served as Queen's or King's Counsel in Bombay.

References

1845 births
1899 deaths
Knights Bachelor
Members of the Inner Temple
Chief Justices of the Allahabad High Court
Chief Justices of the Bombay High Court
19th-century Indian judges
20th-century Indian judges
People educated at Bradford Grammar School
People from Ohio
American people of English descent
Alumni of Pembroke College, Oxford